Mattarnovy may refer to:
Georg Johann Mattarnovi, architect (d. 1719), father of Philipp Georg Mattarnovi
Philipp Georg Mattarnovi, engraver (1716-1742)